Itigi is a town in central Tanzania. It is located in Itigi District of the Singida Region.

The town is made up of the wards Itigi and Itigi Majengo. According to the 2012 Tanzania National Census, the population of these two wards combined was 21,777.

Transport 
Unpaved Trunk road T18 from Manyoni to Tabora and unpaved trunk road T22 from Singida Region to Mbeya Region pass through the town.

Itigi is a station on the Central Line of Tanzanian Railways.

See also 

 Railway stations in Tanzania
 Transport in Tanzania

References 

Populated places in Singida Region